KPID, or other forms, may refer to:
Kommunistisk Parti i Danmark (KPiD), known in English as Communist Party in Denmark
Komisyon para sa mga Pilipino sa Ibayong Dagat (KPID), known in English as Commission on Filipinos Overseas (CFO)